Claude Brownlee (born April 8, 1944) is a former American football defensive tackle. He played for the Miami Dolphins in 1967.

References

1944 births
Living people
Players of American football from Columbus, Georgia
American football defensive tackles
Benedictine Ravens football players
Miami Dolphins players